The Helmos or Chelmos Observatory is an observatory located at the top of mount Chelmos, near Kalavryta, southern Greece. It is the largest research infrastructure of the National Observatory of Athens and IAASARS. The observatory was completed and first opened in 2001. Its main equipment is the Aristarchos 2.3 m Telescope, manufactured by German company Carl Zeiss AG. With the finance from the universities of Patras and Manchester.

See also
 List of astronomical observatories

References

Astronomical observatories in Greece
Buildings and structures in Achaea